Transcription regulator protein BACH2 (broad complex-tramtrack-bric a brac and Cap'n'collar homology 2) is a protein that in humans is encoded by the BACH2 gene. It contains a BTB/POZ domain at its N-terminus which forms a disulphide-linked dimer  and a bZip_Maf domain at the C-terminus.

Disease associations 
Single nucleotide variants in BACH2 have been linked to a number of autoimmune diseases in humans. Mendelian BACH2-related immunodeficiency and autoimmunity (BRIDA) syndrome in humans is caused by haploinsufficiency of this transcription factor resulting from germline mutations. In T cells, BACH2 is recruited by the transcription factor Vitamin D receptor (VDR) both in vitro and in vivo (for example, in psoriasis skin) and is an essential component of the regulatory functions of Vitamin D in these cells.

Model organisms 

Model organisms have been used in the study of BACH2 function. A conditional knockout mouse line called Bach2tm1a(EUCOMM)Wtsi was generated at the Wellcome Trust Sanger Institute. Male and female animals underwent a standardized phenotypic screen to determine the effects of deletion. Additional screens performed:  - In-depth immunological phenotyping - in-depth bone and cartilage phenotyping

References

Further reading

External links 
 
 
 

Transcription factors